Southern Regional can refer to the following things:

 Southern Regional Education Board, a nonprofit education association based in Atlanta, Georgia
 Southern Regional College, a college in Northern Ireland
 Southern Regional Council, a civil-rights organization located in Atlanta, Georgia
 Southern Regional School District, a school district located in Manahawkin, New Jersey
Southern Regional High School, a high school located in the aforementioned district
 Southern Regional Testing Agency, and examination agency for dentistry in the United States